ECM may refer to:

Economics and commerce 
 Engineering change management
 Equity capital markets
 Error correction model, an econometric model
 European Common Market

Mathematics 
 Elliptic curve method
 European Congress of Mathematics

Science and medicine 
 Ectomycorrhiza
 Electron cloud model
 Engineered Cellular Magmatics
 Erythema chronicum migrans
 Extracellular matrix

Sport 
 European Championships Management

Technology 
 Electrochemical machining
 Electronic contract manufacturing
 Electronic countermeasure
 Electronically commutated motor
 Energy conservation measure
 Engine control module
 Enterprise content management
 Error correction mode

Other uses
 Editio Critica Maior, a critical edition of the Greek New Testament
 ECM Records, a record label
 ECM Real Estate Investments, a defunct real estate developer based in Luxembourg
 Edinburgh City Mission, a Christian organization in Scotland
 Elektrani na Severna Makedonija, a power company in North Macedonia
 Episcopal Conference of Malawi
 Every Child Matters, a UK Government initiative for children
 Every Child Ministries, a Christian charity for African children
 Exceptional case-marking, in linguistics
 Energy Corrected Milk, in farming